Ottawa/Macdonald–Cartier International Airport or Macdonald–Cartier International Airport  is the main international airport serving Ottawa, Ontario, Canada, and its metropolitan area known as the National Capital Region. It is named after the Canadian statesmen and two of the "founding fathers of Canada", Sir John A. Macdonald and Sir George-Étienne Cartier. The airport was the home base for First Air.

It is classified as an airport of entry by Nav Canada, and is staffed by the Canada Border Services Agency. It is one of eight Canadian airports that have United States border preclearance facilities. The airport was formerly a military base known as CFB Ottawa South/CFB Uplands, and is still home to the Royal Canadian Air Force's 412 Transport Squadron, which provides air transport for Canadian and foreign government officials.

History

On July 2, 1927, twelve P-1 airplanes under command of Major Thomas G. Lanphier, Air Corps, proceeded from Selfridge Field to Ottawa, acting as Special Escort for Colonel Charles Lindbergh, who was to attend at the opening of the Dominion Jubilee. First Lieutenant J. Thad Johnson, Air Corps, commanding 27th Pursuit Squadron, was killed in an unsuccessful parachute jump after a collision with another plane of formation in demonstration on arrival over Ottawa. There is now a street leading to the airport industrial section named after the aviator.

The airport was opened at Uplands on a high plateau (then) south of Ottawa by the Ottawa Flying Club, which still operates from the field. During World War II, when it was known as Uplands, the airport hosted No. 2 Service Flying Training School for the British Commonwealth Air Training Plan, providing advanced pilot training in Harvard and Yale aircraft.

In 1950, to allow for a southward expansion of the airport, the nearby farming community of Bowesville, settled from 1821, was expropriated. The last residents left and the village school was torn down in 1951. The current main airport terminal now stands on the site of the crossroads at the centre of the village. The road to the south of the airport still bears the name "Bowesville Road".

During the 1950s, while the airport was still named Uplands and a joint-use civilian/military field, it was the busiest airport in Canada by takeoffs and landings, reaching a peak of 307,079 aircraft movements in 1959, nearly double its current traffic. At the time, the airport had scheduled airline flights by Trans-Canada Air Lines (Toronto, Montreal, and Val-d'Or), Trans Air (Churchill), and Eastern Air Lines (New York via Syracuse and Washington via Montreal). With the arrival of civilian jet travel, the Canadian government built a new field south of the original one, with two much longer runways and a new terminal building designed to handle up to 900,000 passengers/year. The terminal building had been scheduled to open in 1959, but during the opening ceremonies, a United States Air Force F-104 Starfighter went supersonic during a low pass over the airport, and the resultant sonic boom shattered most of the glass in the airport (including the entire north wall) and damaged ceiling tiles, door and window frames, and even structural beams. As a result, the opening was delayed until April 1960. The original terminal building and Trans-Canada Airways/DOT hangar continued in private use on the airport's north field until the Fall 2011 when it was demolished.

The airport was renamed "Ottawa International Airport" in 1964. It became "Ottawa Macdonald–Cartier International Airport" in 1993.

In 2017, the Canadian Border Services Agency started to use facial recognition technology to process incoming international travellers. All international passengers are directed to Primary Inspection Kiosks before seeing a Border Services Officer and are no longer required to fill out a declaration card.

On November 1, 2022 Porter Airlines and the Ottawa International Airport Authority announced they would be investing over $65 million in YOW into the future. Porter also announced they would be building two aircraft hangars at a size of over 150,000sq. ft each, to maintain the Embraer E195-E2 and Bombardier Dash 8 aircraft. These will be built in two phases, with phase one being completed by the end of 2023, and phase two in the first quarter of 2024. Making YOW the primary E195-E2 maintenance base and creating 200 local jobs.

Facility layout 

The airport consists of two distinct airfields connected by a taxiway. The smaller north field, originally referred to as Uplands, was founded by the Ottawa Flying Club in the late 1920s and then used by Trans-Canada Air Lines, the predecessor of Air Canada. This was the area primarily used by No. 2 Service Flying Training School. Several hangars were constructed during World War II, but were all demolished by the early 2000s.

The north field is still popular for general aviation, although only one of its runways, 04/22, is still in use. There are a number of aircraft component repair facilities located within the same grouping of buildings as the Ottawa Flying Club.

The south field consists of the two longer runways, 07/25 and 14/32, designed for jet airliners. The public passenger terminal is tucked into the north side of the intersection of the two runways, while the two general aviation FBOs for the south field are nearer to the threshold of runway 25. Customs services for private aircraft are available at the two fixed-base operators (FBO), Shell Aerocentre and Skyservice Business Aviation, on the south field. There are also a number of aviation component repair facilities on airport grounds, mostly around the Skyservice complex. The Government of Canada operates a number of hangars, including the Canada Reception Centre, which is used to greet visiting dignitaries. The National Research Council operates two facilities on the north side of the grounds, including two wind tunnels. One of these has supersonic capabilities, and the other has a 9m diameter, being the largest in Canada. Transport Canada operates two facilities on airport grounds, one which houses training equipment, including flight simulators, and a hangar for maintenance and storage of government owned aircraft.

Terminal
At the turn of the millennium, the Ottawa Airport Authority announced plans to build a second, adjacent terminal to meet the demands of increased traffic. The terminal was built ahead of schedule and opened on October 12, 2003. The terminal building now handles all airline passenger traffic. A section of the 1960 terminal, which was connected to the new terminal by an enclosed bridge, was still used at peak times of the day when extra gate space is needed, and it also handled most domestic regional flights. Funding for the terminal construction was collected from the parking meters outside the terminal beginning in January 1997, when rates were hiked to cover the costs of a new terminal building.

The old terminal and tower, built in 1960, was a modernist International style designed by architects James Strutt, William Gilleland and Transport Canada. They had been heavily renovated and modernized in 1985–87, which included the removal of a seating area containing personal television screens which would provide 15 minutes of VHF TV channels for 25 cents, as well as an open ceiling design. They were demolished in 2008 to make way for Phase II of the new terminal.

The airport's board of directors approved a further expansion of the airport's passenger terminal on April 4, 2006. The extension of the new terminal was built in phases by Brisbin Brook Benyon and Architectura. Phase II, the next phase of the expansion program opened March 13, 2008. The 1960 terminal was designed by Gilleland and Strutt and by Transport Canada architect W.A. Ramsay and renovations by Murray and Murray, Griffiths and Rankin from 1984 to 1987. It closed on March 13, 2008, and has been demolished and by the end of 2008 its former location was paved over to provide room for more gates and jetways.

Interior design
The terminal's design focuses on creating a calm and easy travel experience for passengers but also honours aspects of the region through the display of various art by commissioned Canadian artists. A soothing water feature representing the meeting of the region's three rivers runs throughout the terminal. Copper and limestone finishes are visible throughout, representative of the capital's Parliament Buildings. Other Canadian features include an inukshuk commissioned and sponsored by First Air, and a rare traditional birch bark canoe built by the master craftsman and Algonquin leader who created an identical one for the late Prime Minister Pierre Elliott Trudeau. The airport features a large-scale carved glass sculpture by Canadian glass artist, Warren Carther.

Airlines and destinations
Macdonald–Cartier Airport is part of Canada's busiest air corridor between Ottawa, Montreal, and Toronto, which is commonly referred to as the Eastern Triangle. The airport is also a gateway for flights to the eastern Arctic via Iqaluit.

International destinations (within the continent) 
Ottawa's airport serves many major North American airlines and several cities in the United States. 

Once suspended from March 2020 until October 2021, it began reopening back cross-border destinations within the continent, beginning with service to Fort Lauderdale and Washington–Dulles, with other destinations in the United States and Caribbean countries soon after.

International destinations (overseas) 
The airport previously had several connections to Europe, mainly to London–Heathrow, Frankfurt and Paris–Charles de Gaulle.

In September 2019, Canadian flag carrier Air Canada announced that it would shut down its seasonal daily route between Ottawa and Frankfurt in Germany, a key Star Alliance hub. In due course, Lufthansa announced to begin flights from Frankfurt to YOW five times per week from May 2020. This plan did not materialize though. 

Since March 2020, Ottawa lost all nonstop transatlantic routes to Europe. This long hiatus will end in late June 2023 when, on February 2, 2023, Air France announced a new, year-round route connecting Ottawa with its main hub, at Paris' principal airport, with service offered 5 times weekly. With a Airbus A330-200, flight AF328 will come in first, before AF327 will go back soon after.

The airport never had flights to any other continent across the rest of the world, thus requiring a connection to any other Canadian major international hub, such as Montreal, Toronto or Vancouver.

Passenger

Cargo
Non-stop and same-plane freighter and/or combi flights

Statistics

Annual passenger traffic

Ground transportation

Public transit
OC Transpo operates route 97 with frequent express bus service to the airport bus stop (Airport station) along a dedicated BRT transitway with connections to the O-Train Confederation Line, Trillium Line, and other transit stations. An OC Transpo ticket machine is available at the southern end of the Arrivals level.

Construction has begun on a light rail spur linking that airport to the city's light rail system. The current plan calls for a station to be built inside the terminal as part of a future terminal expansion, with the airport volunteering funds for the building of the station. The extension is planned to open in September 2023.

Automobile
Taxis, airport limos, and shuttle buses are available 24 hours a day, 7 days a week. There are several rental car agencies located at the airport, as well as ride-sharing services such as Uber and Lyft.

Bicycle
In the more temperate seasons, it is possible to cycle downtown from the airport via the Capital Pathway and a number of quiet residential streets.

Awards
The 2010 Airport Service Quality (ASQ) Award for Best Airport in the World for the 2–5 million passengers category went to Ottawa Airport.

In February 2010, Ottawa Macdonald–Cartier International Airport was recognized by customers for its excellent customer service in the results of Airports Council International's (ACI) Airport Service Quality (ASQ) program. For the fifth consecutive year, Ottawa placed second overall for worldwide airports that serve between 0 and 5 million passengers. In 2008, 118 airports from around the world participated in ASQ.

Along with Air Canada, the airport was the joint winner of the 2010 Ottawa Tourism Award for Tourism Partnership of the Year in recognition of the co-operative work done in promoting Air Canada's non-stop flight between Frankfurt and Ottawa.

Also in 2010, the airport was presented with three Airport Revenue News Best Airport Concessions Awards. In the Small Airport division, Ottawa was named the winner in the following categories: Airport with the Best Concessions Program Design, Airport with the Best Concessions Management Team, and Airport with the Best Overall Concessions Program.

The 2011 it won Best Airport in North America of the Airport Service Quality Awards by Airports Council International, as well as 2nd Best Airport by Size in the 2 to 5 million passenger category.

Incidents and accidents
 In August 1959, a U.S. Air Force Lockheed F-104 Starfighter performed a low fly-by of the airport during celebration of the opening of a new terminal in Ottawa and on request by the organisers went supersonic over the main runway. The result was catastrophic, causing windows and parts of the walls of the terminal to shatter. The terminal was only reopened in 1960.
 On May 19, 1967, an Air Canada Douglas DC-8 on a training flight from Montreal crashed on approach to the Ottawa airport, killing all three crew members.
 On September 15, 1988, a Bradley Air Services (now First Air) BAe 748 crashed on approach to runway 25, killing both crew members.
 On July 1, 1990, a P-51 Mustang crashed on the Hylands Golf Course during the National Capital Airshow, killing the pilot, Harry Tope. He was performing with the aircraft fully fueled and luggage on board for the trip home after the airshow and was unable to recover from a manoeuver.
 On June 13, 1997, a North American Airlines Fairchild Swearingen Metroliner struck the runway with gear retracted during a botched approach, resulting in propeller strikes and a fire in one engine when it came to rest on runway 25. The aircraft was written off, but the crew escaped without injury.
 On September 15, 2000, a Miami Air International Boeing 727 arriving to pick up the Florida Panthers hockey team ran off the end of the runway. There were no injuries.
 On July 14, 2004, US Airways Express Flight 3504, an Embraer ERJ-145LR (N829HK) operated by Trans States Airlines, overran the runway and sustained minor damage to the inboard left main landing gear tire. There were no serious injuries.
 On February 17, 2008, a WestJet Boeing 737 from Calgary International Airport went off the end of runway 07 shortly after landing. None of the 86 passengers and six crew members on board were injured. A slippery runway and the lack of use of the speed brakes on the aircraft contributed to the accident.
 On April 22, 2009, a Porter Airlines Bombardier Dash 8 had its tail damaged after it struck the ground upon landing. It was taken out of service and was later repaired.
 On June 16, 2010, United Express Flight 8050, an Embraer ERJ-145 (N847HK) operated by Trans States Airlines, overran the runway and was substantially damaged when the nose gear collapsed. There were 36 people on board, 33 passengers and three crew, and two of the crew and one passenger were injured.
 On September 4, 2011, United Express Flight 3363, an Embraer ERJ-145 (N840HK) operated by Trans States Airlines, slid off the runway upon landing. All 44 passengers and the three crew aboard were uninjured, although the plane sustained substantial damage.
 On July 31, 2017, Air Transat Flight 157, an Airbus A330-200, en route from Brussels to Montréal-Trudeau was diverted to Ottawa due to a chain of storms passing through the Montreal area. More than 300 passengers were kept on the plane without water, electricity, or air conditioning and rationed food for six hours. A passenger called 911 due to the deteriorating situation with some passengers complaining of suffocation. Airport authorities responded by delivering water and disembarking passengers including those complaining of suffocation injuries. Air Transat blamed congestion at Ottawa's airport for the situation, where airport administration stated that the pilots asked for no help during the six-hour situation. The event enraged Canadian lawmakers pushing to improve Canada's passenger bill of rights.

References

External links

 

 Aviation occurrence information for YOW at Civil Aviation Daily Occurrence Reporting System (CADORS)

Certified airports in Ontario
Transport in Ottawa
Airports of the British Commonwealth Air Training Plan
Buildings and structures in Ottawa
John A. Macdonald
Canadian airports with United States border preclearance
Airport
National Airports System